Coetzer is a surname. Notable people with the surname include:

Amanda Coetzer (born 1971), South African tennis player
Cameron Coetzer (born 1995), South African badminton player
Gert Coetzer, South African rugby league player
Jacques Coetzer (born 1968), South African artist
Kyle Coetzer (born 1984), Scottish cricketer
Leán Coetzer (born 1969), South African dancer and choreographer
Marius Coetzer (born 1984), South African rugby union player
Pierre Coetzer (born 1961), South African heavyweight boxer